Fenwick is a small village and civil parish in the Metropolitan Borough of Doncaster (part of South Yorkshire, England), on the border with North Yorkshire. It was historically part of the West Riding of Yorkshire until 1974. It is located at an elevation of around 6 metres above sea level and had a population of 113,  increasing slightly to 121 at the 2011 Census. The northern boundary of the parish is marked by the River Went.

See also
Listed buildings in Fenwick, South Yorkshire

References

External links

Fenwick
Civil parishes in South Yorkshire